Bruno Miguel Semedo Varela (born 4 November 1994) is a Portuguese professional footballer who plays for Vitória S.C. as a goalkeeper.

He represented Benfica, Vitória de Setúbal and Vitória de Guimarães in the Primeira Liga. Abroad, he played with Valladolid in Spain and Ajax in the Netherlands.

Across all age groups, Varela earned 53 international caps for Portugal, and was part of their under-23 team at the 2016 Olympics.

Club career

Benfica
Born in Lisbon and of Cape Verdean descent, Varela joined local club S.L. Benfica's youth system at the age of 11. On 22 September 2012, whilst still a junior, he made his professional debut, appearing for the reserves in a 2–0 away win against C.D. Aves in the Segunda Liga.

From 2013 to 2015, with the team still in the second division, Varela was the undisputed starter. His competitive input with the main squad consisted of nine bench appearances, the first of which occurred on 29 August 2011 in a Primeira Liga match at C.D. Nacional when he was just 16 years old.

On 29 August 2015, Varela was loaned to Real Valladolid in a season-long move. Barred by Athletic Bilbao youth product Kepa Arrizabalaga, he appeared in only one official game for the Spaniards during his spell, the 1–3 Segunda División home loss to RCD Mallorca in the last matchday.

Vitória Setúbal
On 2 July 2016, Varela left Benfica and signed with fellow top flight side Vitória F.C. until June 2021. He made his debut in the competition on 21 August on his return to the Estádio da Luz, a 1–1 draw against the reigning champions.

Return to Benfica
In July 2017, Varela agreed on a return to Benfica for a fee of around €100,000. He made his competitive debut on 5 August, starting in the 3–1 victory over Vitória S.C. in the Supertaça Cândido de Oliveira. His first appearance in the UEFA Champions League took place on 12 September, in a 1–2 group stage home loss to PFC CSKA Moscow.

On 16 September 2017, Varela committed a blunder which resulted in a 2–1 away defeat against Boavista FC. He was quickly deemed surplus to requirements by manager Rui Vitória, with the club acquiring Mile Svilar and Odisseas Vlachodimos in the following weeks; however, after the former went down with influenza and the latter was only due to arrive in January, he was made the starter again, notably receiving Player of the match accolades in a 0–0 away draw with FC Porto.

On 26 January 2019, without a single competitive appearance, Varela was loaned to Dutch Eredivisie club AFC Ajax until the end of the season, with the option to buy. On 24 June, the move was extended for another year.

Mainly a reserve player during his tenure in Amsterdam, Varela made his competitive debut for Ajax on 22 January 2020 in the 7–0 home demolition of SV Spakenburg in the round of 16 of the KNVB Cup. His first league match occurred four days later, in a 2–1 away loss against FC Groningen.

Vitória Guimarães
On 19 August 2020, Varela returned to Portugal and joined Vitória de Guimarães on a four-year deal. He missed the start of his second season due to a right thigh tear, during which Matouš Trmal had a run in the team.

International career
Varela represented Portugal at the 2013 UEFA European Under-19 Championship and at the 2013 FIFA U-20 World Cup, being a backup to José Sá in the latter tournament. He was also part of the under-20 squad at the 2014 Toulon Tournament, starting in an eventual third-place finish.

Varela again played understudy to Sá during the 2015 European Under-21 Championship, failing to appear for the runners-up. He was first choice during the 2016 Summer Olympics competition, in an eventual quarter-final run.

On 21 March 2017, Varela received his first call-up to the Portugal senior side, replacing the injured Anthony Lopes for the 2018 FIFA World Cup qualifier against Hungary and a friendly with Sweden to be held late in that month. In October 2020, he replaced the same player after he tested had positive for COVID-19.

Club statistics

Honours
Benfica
Supertaça Cândido de Oliveira: 2017

Ajax
KNVB Cup: 2018–19
Johan Cruyff Shield: 2019

International
UEFA European Under-21 Championship runner-up: 2015

References

External links

1994 births
Living people
Portuguese sportspeople of Cape Verdean descent
Black Portuguese sportspeople
Portuguese footballers
Footballers from Lisbon
Association football goalkeepers
Primeira Liga players
Liga Portugal 2 players
S.L. Benfica B players
Vitória F.C. players
S.L. Benfica footballers
Vitória S.C. players
Segunda División players
Real Valladolid players
Eredivisie players
Eerste Divisie players
AFC Ajax players
Jong Ajax players
Portugal youth international footballers
Portugal under-21 international footballers
Footballers at the 2016 Summer Olympics
Olympic footballers of Portugal
Portuguese expatriate footballers
Expatriate footballers in Spain
Expatriate footballers in the Netherlands
Portuguese expatriate sportspeople in Spain
Portuguese expatriate sportspeople in the Netherlands